The following list includes monuments and memorials built in or by the Soviet Union.
26 Commissars Memorial
Alyosha Monument, Murmansk
Barmaley Fountain
Bronze Soldier of Tallinn
Chekhov Monument in Taganrog
Cosmonauts Alley
Defence Forces Cemetery of Tallinn
Garibaldi Monument in Taganrog
Green Belt of Glory
Katyn war cemetery
Khimki War Memorial
Leningrad Hero City Obelisk
Liberty Statue (Budapest)
Mamayev Kurgan
Memorial Museum of Cosmonautics
Memorial to Polish Soldiers and German Anti-Fascists
Memorial to the Victims of the Deportation of 1944
Monument to the Conquerors of Space
Monument to the Liberators of Soviet Latvia and Riga from the German Fascist Invaders
Monument to the Liberator Soldier (Kharkiv)
Monument to the Revolution of 1905
Monument to the Soviet Army, Sofia
Mother Armenia
Mother Armenia, Gyumri
Mother Motherland, Kiev
The Motherland Calls
Mound of Glory
Mound of Immortality
Museum of The History of Ukraine in World War II
Nizami Mausoleum
Poklonnaya Hill
Piskaryovskoye Memorial Cemetery
Robespierre Monument
Sardarapat Memorial
Shtyki Memorial
Slavín
Soviet Military Cemetery, Warsaw
Soviet War Memorial (Schönholzer Heide)
Soviet War Memorial (Tiergarten)
Soviet War Memorial (Treptower Park)
Soviet War Memorial (Vienna)
Memorial of Glory (Tiraspol)
Monument to Soviet Tank Crews
To Donbas Liberators
Tomb of the Unknown Soldier (Moscow)
Tsitsernakaberd
Vagif Mausoleum
Victory Monument in Netanya
Victory Monument (Tolyatti)
Victory Park, Dushanbe
Victory Park (Tolyatti)
Victory Square, Bishkek
Victory Square, Saint Petersburg
Victory Square (Vitebsk)

See also
Personifications of Russia#Statues
Propaganda in the Soviet Union
Monuments and memorials built in the Soviet Union
Propaganda in the Soviet Union